This article lists parliamentary boroughs and associated county constituencies 1832–1918. The significance of this list is that during this period non-resident 40 shilling freeholders of (usually) land located in a borough, qualified for a parliamentary vote in the county.

Franchise provisions
Amongst the qualifications for a county vote in United Kingdom parliamentary elections, which applied from 1832 until 1918, was the possession of a freehold estate of the annual value of 40 shillings. Residence on the property was not required from freeholders. A freehold situate in a Parliamentary borough qualified the owner for the county vote, unless it was in his own occupation.

List of associated constituencies
The list includes all county constituencies 1832–1885, even if there are no associated boroughs. From 1885 the county constituency is only listed if it is known to have been associated with a borough.

The place of election was where the hustings were held; at which candidates were nominated, polling took place (before the introduction of multiple polling places in county constituencies) and where the result was announced.

England
Some boroughs were a city or town which was a county of itself, in which the non-resident freeholders were ancient right voters in the borough. This applied to Bristol, Exeter, Norwich, and Nottingham. Those boroughs are not included in the list below.

Notes:-
 a County divisions redistributed in 1868. No information currently available about the association of divisions with Parliamentary boroughs 1868–1885.
 b Birkenhead was enfranchised in 1861 and its association with a county division is unavailable until the 1885 redistribution.
 c West Riding of Yorkshire divided in two in 1865 and three in 1868.

See also
 Parliamentary Franchise in the United Kingdom 1885–1918
 Forty Shilling Freeholders

References
 Boundaries of Parliamentary Constituencies 1885-1972, compiled and edited by F.W.S. Craig (Parliamentary Reference Publications 1972)
 The Constitutional Year Book 1900 (William Blackstone & Sons 1900) out of copyright
 Electoral Reform in England and Wales, by Charles Seymour (David & Charles Reprints 1970)
 The Parliaments of England by Henry Stooks Smith (1st edition published in three volumes 1844–50), second edition edited (in one volume) by F.W.S. Craig (Political Reference Publications 1973)
 Social Geography of British Elections 1885-1910. by Henry Pelling (Macmillan 1967)

Political history of the United Kingdom
Lists of constituencies of the Parliament of the United Kingdom
19th century in the United Kingdom
20th century in the United Kingdom